Sun Taifeng (born 26 August 1982) is a Chinese discus thrower.

She won the silver medal at the 2005 Asian Championships and finished fourth at the 2007 World Championships.

Her personal best throw is 64.98 metres, achieved in June 2007 in Suzhou. The Chinese, and Asian, record is currently held by Xiao Yanling with 71.68 metres.

References

1982 births
Living people
Chinese female discus throwers
21st-century Chinese women